The 2020 Kite Awards (Vietnamese: Giải Cánh diều 2020) is the 28th edition of Vietnam Cinema Association Awards, also the 19th edition since the award is officially named Kite. It honored the best in Vietnam film, television works of 2020.

Due to the spread of the COVID-19 epidemic with many complicated developments, the organizers decided not to organize side activities and postpone the announcement ceremony to the end of the year instead of March as usual. On December 22, 2021, the announcement and award ceremony was held in a compact manner with a limited number of guests in Hanoi.

This year, a total of 141 works participated in the award, including: 12 feature films, 16 TV drama series, 60 documentaries, 12 science films, 20 animated films, 18 short films and 3 film studies.

In feature film category, Dad, I'm Sorry and Camellia Sisters both won 3 with the former was awarded Golden Kite. Drama The Crocodile File from the series Criminal Police unexpectedly won big with 4 awards included Golden Kite.

Winner and nominees 
Winners are listed first, highlighted in boldface.
Highlighted title indicates Golden Kite for the Best Film/Drama/Study winner(s).
Highlighted title indicates Silver Kite for the Second Best Film/Drama/Study winner(s).
Highlighted title indicates Film/Drama/Study(s) received the Certificate of Merit.
Other nominees

Feature film

Multiple wins 
The following films received multiple wins:

Television film

Multiple wins 
The following films received multiple wins:

Animated film

Documentary film

Science film

Short film

Film critic/theory research

See also 
 40th National Television Festival
 2020 VTV Awards

References

External links
Thế Giới Điện Ảnh Online – Official Vietnam Cinema Association Magazine 

Vietnamese film awards
Kite Awards
Kite Awards
2020 in Vietnam
2020 in Vietnamese television
Impact of the COVID-19 pandemic on cinema
Impact of the COVID-19 pandemic on television